Hull speed or displacement speed is the speed at which the wavelength of a vessel's bow wave is equal to the waterline length of the vessel.  As boat speed increases from rest, the wavelength of the bow wave increases, and usually its crest-to-trough dimension (height) increases as well.  When hull speed is exceeded, a vessel in displacement mode will appear to be climbing up the back of its bow wave.

From a technical perspective, at hull speed the bow and stern waves interfere constructively, creating relatively large waves, and thus a relatively large value of wave drag. Ship drag for a displacement hull increases smoothly with speed as hull speed is approached and exceeded, often with no noticeable inflection at hull speed.

The concept of hull speed is not used in modern naval architecture, where considerations of speed/length ratio or Froude number are considered more helpful.

Background
As a ship moves in the water, it creates standing waves that oppose its movement. This effect increases dramatically in full-formed hulls at a Froude number of about 0.35 (which corresponds to a speed/length ratio (see below for definition) of slightly less than 1.20 knot·ft−½) because of the rapid increase of resistance from the transverse wave train. When the Froude number grows to ~0.40 (speed/length ratio ~1.35), the wave-making resistance increases further from the divergent wave train. This trend of increase in wave-making resistance continues up to a Froude number of ~0.45 (speed/length ratio ~1.50), and peaks at a Froude number of ~0.50 (speed/length ratio ~1.70).

This very sharp rise in resistance at speed/length ratio around 1.3 to 1.5 probably seemed insurmountable in early sailing ships and so became an apparent barrier. This led to the concept of hull speed.

Empirical calculation and speed/length ratio

Hull speed can be calculated by the following formula:

where
 is the length of the waterline in feet, and
 is the hull speed of the vessel in knots

If the length of waterline is given in metres and desired hull speed in knots, the coefficient is 2.43 kn·m−½. The constant may be given as 1.34 to 1.51 knot·ft−½ in imperial units (depending on the source), or 4.50 to 5.07 km·h−1·m−½ in metric units, or 1.25 to 1.41 m·s−1·m−½ in SI units.

First principles calculation 
Because the hull speed is related to the length of the boat and the wavelength of the wave it produces as it moves through water, there is another formula that arrives at the same values for hull speed based on the waterline length.

where

 is the length of the waterline in meters,
 is the hull speed of the vessel in meters per second, and
 is the acceleration due to gravity in meters per second squared.

This equation is the same as the equation used to calculate the speed of surface water waves in deep water.  It dramatically simplifies the units on the constant before the radical in the empirical equation, while giving a deeper understanding of the principles at play.

Hull design implications
Wave-making resistance depends on the proportions and shape of the hull: many modern displacement designs can exceed their hull speed even without planing. These include hulls with very fine ends, long hulls with relatively narrow beam and wave-piercing designs. Such hull forms are commonly used by canoes, competitive rowing boats, catamarans, fast ferries. For example, racing kayaks can exceed hull speed by more than 100% even though they do not plane.

Heavy boats with hulls designed for planing generally cannot exceed hull speed without planing. 

Ultra light displacement boats are designed to plane and thereby circumvent the limitations of hull speed.

Semi-displacement hulls are usually intermediate between these two extremes.

See also
 Ship resistance and propulsion
 Wave making resistance

References
A simple explanation of hull speed as it relates to heavy and light displacement hulls
Hull speed chart for use with rowed boats
On the subject of high speed monohulls, Daniel Savitsky, Professor Emeritus, Davidson Laboratory, Stevens Institute of Technology
Low Drag Racing Shells

External links

 Converter: knots > km/h  &  km/h > knots

Marine propulsion
Fluid dynamics
Water waves